Mark Baker may refer to:
Mark Baker (animator) (born 1959), British animator
Mark M. Baker (born 1947), New York criminal attorney
Mark Baker (author) (born 1985), British author of books on houses in Wales
Mark Baker (basketball) (born 1969), Dayton Jets head basketball coach and former Ohio State University player
Mark Baker (drummer), drummer for Ministry
Mark Baker (Australian politician) (born 1958), Liberal Party Member of the Australian House of Representatives
Mark Baker (Mississippi politician) (born 1962), member of the Mississippi House of Representatives
Mark Baker (linguist) (born 1959), American linguist, investigating polysynthetic languages, like Mohawk
Mark Baker (actor) (1946–2018), American stage and film actor
Mark Baker (Wyoming politician), American politician in the Wyoming House of Representatives

See also
Mark Linn-Baker (born 1954), American actor and director